Michigan's 20th Senate district is one of 38 districts in the Michigan Senate. The 20th district was created by the 1850 Michigan Constitution, as the 1835 constitution only permitted a maximum of eight senate districts. It has been represented by Republican Aric Nesbitt since 2023, succeeding Democrat Sean McCann.

Geography
District 20 encompasses parts of Allegan, Berrien, Kent, and Van Buren counties.

2011 Apportionment Plan
District 20, as dictated by the 2011 Apportionment Plan, was exactly coterminous with Kalamazoo County, including the city of Kalamazoo and the surrounding communities of Portage, Comstock Northwest, Eastwood, Westwood, Vicksburg, Kalamazoo Township, Oshtemo Township, Texas Township, Comstock Township, and Cooper Township.

The district was located entirely within Michigan's 6th congressional district, and overlapped with the 60th, 61st, 63rd, and 66th districts of the Michigan House of Representatives.

List of senators

Recent election results

2018

2014

Federal and statewide results in District 20

Historical district boundaries

References 

20
Kalamazoo County, Michigan